Sol Furth (March 23, 1907 – October 18, 1990) was an American athlete. He competed in the men's triple jump at the 1932 Summer Olympics.

References

External links
 

1907 births
1990 deaths
Athletes (track and field) at the 1932 Summer Olympics
American male triple jumpers
Olympic track and field athletes of the United States
Place of birth missing